ASV Dronten is a football club from Dronten, Flevoland, Netherlands. In the 2018–19 season, ASV Dronten will be playing in the Saturday Eerste Klasse East (Zaterdag Eerste Klasse D Oost) for the second season, having been relegated after the 2016–17 season, from the Hoofdklasse.

Famous (ex) players
 Hakim Ziyech

References

External links
 Official site

Football clubs in the Netherlands
Association football clubs established in 1962
1962 establishments in the Netherlands
Football clubs in Flevoland
Sport in Dronten